Alruna (Old Norse Ǫlrún, Old High German Ailrun, Modern German Alruna, Alraune) is a Germanic female personal name, from Proto Germanic *aliruna (or possibly *agilruna), which is formed from runa "secret, rune" and a debated prefix that may be ali-, agil-, or alu-.

In German, Alruna was also used as a short form of Adelruna, a different name with a first element *athal- "noble".

In Germanic mythology, Ailrun is the wife of Agilaz, the legendary archer. In the poem Völundarkviða, Ölrun (possibly Old Norse "ale rune") is identified as a valkyrie, and as a daughter of Kiár of Valland.

Alruna of Cham was an 11th-century Bavarian recluse, the Roman Catholic patroness of pregnancy. It is also the name for the Mandragora or mandrake plant in a number of Germanic languages, the name of the plant being alruna in Swedish, alrune in Danish and Norwegian and Alraune in German.

Notes

References
 Simek, Rudolf (2007) translated by Angela Hall. Dictionary of Northern Mythology. D.S. Brewer. 

Germanic mythology
Valkyries
Germanic given names